Screen Slate is an online guide for seeing movies in New York City and on the internet. The website curates daily listings of art house and repertory cinema and gallery shows happening in New York City and online, and publishes original essays, cultural criticism, features, and interviews. According to WNYC, Screen Slate is "dedicated to advancing moving image culture."

Notable contributors 

 Jacqueline Castel
 A.S. Hamrah
 Richard Hell
 Mitch Horowitz
 Dean Hurley
 Bill Kartalopoulos
 Stephanie LaCava
 Nicolas Rapold
 Jonathan Rosenbaum
 Aaron Schimberg
 Amy Taubin

References

External links
  – official site

American film websites